Assessment may refer to:

Healthcare
Health assessment, identifies needs of the patient and how those needs will be addressed
Nursing assessment, gathering information about a patient's physiological, psychological, sociological, and spiritual status
Psychiatric assessment, gathering information about a person in a psychiatric or mental health service
Psychological assessment, examination of a person's mental health by a professional such as a psychologist

Other uses
Assessment (journal) (ASMNT), a psychology journal
Educational assessment, documenting knowledge, skills, aptitudes, and beliefs
Environmental impact assessment, assessment of environmental consequences of a plan
Library assessment, to learn about the needs of patrons
Risk assessment, determining value of risk related to a concrete situation and a recognized threat
Survey data collection, marketing assessments
Tax assessment, determining amounts to be paid or assessed for tax or insurance purposes
Vulnerability assessment, identifying, quantifying, and ranking vulnerabilities in a system
Writing assessment, examining practices, technologies, and process of using writing to assess performance and potential

See also
 Exam (disambiguation)
 Examination (disambiguation)